Cibao Fútbol Club is a Dominican professional football team based in Santiago de los Caballeros, Dominican Republic, founded in 2015. The team plays in the Liga Dominicana de Fútbol.

History
Cibao Futbol Club was founded on January 1, 2015, ahead of the inaugural season of the Liga Dominicana de Fútbol. The club built a new stadium, Estadio Cibao FC, that opened on March 8, 2015.

Cibao FC partnered with the Pontificia Universidad Católica Madre y Maestra and the ARMID Foundation to build the stadium and form a development academy. The Pontificia Universidad Católica Madre y Maestra contributed 26,187 square meters of land for the construction of the stadium. The ARMID-Foundation Real Madrid Foundation used these facilities to establish the first Real Madrid Foundation's Tecnification School in Latin America, which will be responsible for giving sports and academic training to children and adolescents.

On May 21st of 2017 the team won the 2017 Caribbean Club Championship by defeating San Juan Jabloteh in the final, becoming the first team from the Dominican Republic to be crowned Caribbean club champions and the first to qualify for the CONCACAF Champions League, the  team played against Guadalajara in the 2018 CONCACAF Champions League.

Stadium

Estadio Cibao FC
Estadio Cibao FC
Is a football stadium located in Pontificia Universidad Católica Madre y Maestra campus, Santiago de los Caballeros, Dominican Republic. It is currently used for football matches and hosts the home games of Cibao FC of the Liga Dominicana de Fútbol. The stadium holds 8,000 spectators.

Players and staff

Squad 
Cibao FC roster 2022

Technical staff

Honours

Championships
2018 Liga Dominicana de Fútbol
2021 Liga Dominicana de Fútbol 
2022 Liga Dominicana de Fútbol

Runner-up
2016 Liga Dominicana de Fútbol Season Runner-up
2019 Liga Dominicana de Fútbol Runner-up

National Cup
Copa Dominicana de Futbol 2015 Winner
Copa Dominicana de Futbol 2016 Winner

International achievements 
Copa Dominico-Haitiana Champions 2016
2017 CFU Club Championship Winners
2022 Caribbean Club Championship Runner-up

References

External links
Official website 

Football clubs in the Dominican Republic
Association football clubs established in 2015
2015 establishments in the Dominican Republic